The Carriage by Air Act 1961 (C.27) was an Act of the Parliament of the United Kingdom that brought the amended (1955) Warsaw Convention into British law, repealing the Carriage by Air Act 1932 which gave the original (1929) Convention effect.

Act
Sections 1 and 2 of the Act cover its application to the United Kingdom, with Section 1 allowing it to come into force when the Queen makes an Order in Council authorising it, and Section 2 using the same procedure for changing or limiting its territorial extent. Section 5 creates a statute of limitations for the convention, saying that no claim of damages for a violation of the convention can be brought more than two years after the problem, defined as either the date the goods arrived or the date they should have arrived. Section 7 allows the Queen to exclude military people, cargo and aircraft from the convention, and Section 13 binds the Crown to following the Act.

References

Bibliography

United Kingdom Acts of Parliament 1961
Civil aviation in the United Kingdom
Aviation law
Transport law in the United Kingdom
Aviation history of the United Kingdom
1961 in aviation
Transport legislation